Chipata Airport  is an airport serving Chipata, a city in the Eastern Province of Zambia.

The Chipata non-directional beacon (Ident: CP) is located on the field.

Location

Airlines and destinations

See also
Transport in Zambia
List of airports in Zambia

References

External links

OpenStreetMap - Chipata Airport

Airports in Zambia
Buildings and structures in Eastern Province, Zambia